Henry Hogg Allan (8 October 1872 – 1965) was a Scottish footballer who played for Heart of Midlothian, East Fife and the Scotland national team.

Allan joined Hearts from local Fife football in April 1897 and helped the club to their third Scottish Cup success in 1901. He earned a solitary cap for Scotland  in March 1902, playing in a 4–1 win over Wales. He represented the Scottish League XI on two occasions. In 1903 he became one of the founding players of East Fife. He later emigrated to Canada.

References

External links
 

1872 births
Scottish footballers
Scotland international footballers
Heart of Midlothian F.C. players
East Fife F.C. players
Association football fullbacks
Scottish Football League players
Scottish Football League representative players
Footballers from Fife
1965 deaths
Scottish emigrants to Canada
Dunfermline Athletic F.C. players
Cowdenbeath F.C. players